The Roman Catholic Diocese of Balasore is a diocese located in the city of Balasore in the Ecclesiastical province of Cuttack–Bhubaneswar in India.

On Monday, 9 December 2013, Pope Francis accepted the resignation from the pastoral governance of the Roman Catholic Diocese of Balasore, presented by Bishop Thomas Thiruthalil, CM, in accordance with Canon 401.1 of the Latin rite 1983 Code of Canon Law. Pope Francis appointed as Bishop-elect of the Roman Catholic Diocese of Balasore, the Reverend Father Simon Kaipuram, C.M., who until then had been serving as dean and professor of Aquinas College of Gopalpur, India, in the Roman Catholic Diocese of Berhampur (based in Berhampur, India).

History
 8 June 1968: Established as the Apostolic Prefecture of Balasore from the Roman Catholic Archdiocese of Calcutta
 18 December 1989: Promoted as Diocese of Balasore

Leadership
 Bishops of Balasore (Latin Rite)
 Bishop Simon Kaipuram, C.M. (9 December 2013 – 22 April 2019)
 Bishop Thomas Thiruthalil, C.M. (18 December 1989 – 9 December 2013)
 Father Jacob Vadakevetil, C.M. (Apostolic Administrator, 14 June 1968 – 1989)

References
 GCatholic.org
 Catholic Hierarchy

Roman Catholic dioceses in India
Christian organizations established in 1968
Roman Catholic dioceses and prelatures established in the 20th century
Christianity in Odisha
Balasore
1968 establishments in Orissa